Events in the year 2021 in Lesotho.

Incumbents

King: Letsie III 
Prime Minister: Moeketsi Majoro

Events
Ongoing — COVID-19 pandemic in Lesotho

Deaths

20 January – Justin Lekhanya, politician, former Chairman of the Military Council (born 1938); diabetes.
17 April – Sebastian Koto Khoarai, cardinal, former Bishop of Mohale's Hoek (born 1929).
15 July – Tsepo Tshola, musician and member of Sankomota (born 1953 or 1954); COVID-19.

References

 
2020s in Lesotho
Years of the 21st century in Lesotho
Lesotho
Lesotho